A page boy is a young male attendant at a wedding or a cotillion (a social dance). This type of wedding attendant is less common than it used to be, but it is still a way of including young relatives or the children of friends in a wedding. Pages are often seen at British royal weddings, such as the wedding of Prince William and Catherine Middleton in 2011. At cotillions, there may be many pages, for effect.

Traditionally, page boys carry the bride's train, especially if the bride is wearing a dress with a long train. Because of the difficulty of managing a train, page boys are generally no younger than age seven, with older boys being preferred for more complicated duties.

In a formal wedding, the ring bearer is a special page who carries the wedding rings for the bridal party. This is almost always symbolic, with the ring bearer carrying a wedding ring cushion on which imitation rings are sewn, while the real wedding bands are kept in the safekeeping of the best man. If the real rings are used, they are generally tacked on with thread to prevent their accidental loss.

Ring bearers are often young relatives or children of friends (usually male but can also be female) and are generally in the same age range as flower girls, which is to say that they are usually no younger than about five nor older than ten, although the age range is up to the marrying couple. If the couple have had any children prior to marriage, then their child(ren) may serve as ring bearer(s).

A coin bearer is similar to a ring bearer. The coin bearer is a young boy who marches up the wedding aisle to bring the wedding coins, a tradition in Spanish-speaking countries. The wedding coins are more commonly known as wedding arrhae, and the coins are presented to the celebrant for a blessing.

References

Wedding ceremony participants